Lansdowne (also spelled Landsdown or Lansdown) is an unincorporated community located within Franklin Township in Hunterdon County, New Jersey. It was named after Lansdown, England. Judge Samuel Johnston (1706–1785) owned a large estate here. Charles Stewart (1729–1800) married Mary Oakley Johnston (d. 1771), daughter of the judge, and lived in the mansion built here, Lansdown, which is listed on the National Register of Historic Places.

References

External links 
 

Franklin Township, Hunterdon County, New Jersey
Unincorporated communities in Hunterdon County, New Jersey
Unincorporated communities in New Jersey